Kendyl Parker Michner Venable (born 3 May 1978) is an American-born Mexican former women's international footballer who played as a midfielder. She was a member of the Mexico women's national football team.

Born in the United States, Michner qualified to represent Mexico internationally through her father, who had been circumstantially born in Mexico City. She was part of the team at the 1999 FIFA Women's World Cup.

References

1978 births
Living people
Citizens of Mexico through descent
Mexican women's footballers
Mexico women's international footballers
Place of birth missing (living people)
1999 FIFA Women's World Cup players
Women's association football midfielders
American women's soccer players
American sportspeople of Mexican descent
Tennessee Volunteers women's soccer players
People from Germantown, Tennessee
Soccer players from Tennessee